The Craignafeich Reservoirs  (also “Craignafeoch”) are a pair of lochs in Archarossan Forest, 3 kilometres west of Tighnabruaich. The main concrete dam is 15.8 metres high, and was completed in 1972.

See also
 List of reservoirs and dams in the United Kingdom

Sources
"Argyll and Bute Council Reservoirs Act 1975 Public Register"

Reservoirs in Argyll and Bute